Toronto Northeast was a federal electoral district represented in the House of Commons of Canada from 1925 to 1935. It was located in the city of Toronto in the province of Ontario. This riding was created in 1924 from parts of Toronto North and York South ridings.

It consisted of the part of the city of Toronto north of Bloor Street, and east of Bathurst Street.

The electoral district was abolished in 1933 when it was redistributed between Eglinton, Rosedale, Spadina and St. Paul's ridings.

Electoral history

|- 
  
|Conservative
|BAKER, Richard Langton 
|align="right"|20,877
  
|Liberal
|MATTHEWS, Albert Edward
|align="right"|8,073    
|}

|- 
  
|Conservative
|YOUNG, Newton Manly  
|align="right"|11,005
  
|Conservative
|BAKER, Richard Langton  
|align="right"|9,639   
  
|Liberal
|PUGH, Thomas James 
|align="right"|5,994
|}

|- 
  
|Conservative
|BAKER, Richard Langton 
|align="right"|16,979 
  
|Liberal
|URQUHART, George Alexander 
|align="right"| 10,701   
|}

See also 

 List of Canadian federal electoral districts
 Past Canadian electoral districts

External links 

 Website of the Parliament of Canada

Former federal electoral districts of Ontario
Federal electoral districts of Toronto